Chico Xavier is a 2010 Brazilian drama film directed by Daniel Filho, written by Marcos Bernstein, and starring Nelson Xavier, Christiane Torloni, Giulia Gam, Letícia Sabatella, Giovanna Antonelli and Tony Ramos. It was released in Brazil on April 2, 2010. The movie is a biography of the Brazilian medium Chico Xavier.

Cast
Nelson Xavier as Chico Xavier (1969 to 1975)
Ângelo Antônio as Chico Xavier (1931 to 1959)
Matheus Costa as Chico Xavier (1918 to 1922)
Tony Ramos as Orlando
Christiane Torloni as Glória
Giulia Gam as Rita
Letícia Sabatella as Maria
Luis Melo asJoão Candido
Pedro Paulo Rangel as Father Scarzelo
Giovanna Antonelli as Cidália
André Dias as Emmanuel
Paulo Goulart as Saulo Guimarães
Cássia Kiss as Iara
Cássio Gabus Mendes as Father Julio Maria
Rosi Campos as Cleide
Carla Daniel as Carmosina

External links
 Official website
 
 Helpful article about this film's reception and the upcoming related films about Chico Xavier

2010 films
2010 biographical drama films
2010s Portuguese-language films
Brazilian biographical drama films
Films set in the 20th century
Films directed by Daniel Filho
Films about Spiritism
Films based on biographies
2010 drama films